Reprise is the third album by British tenor Russell Watson released in 2002.

Track listing
Composers/librettists and/or songwriters in brackets

"Torna a Surriento" (Ernesto De Curtis/Giambattista De Curtis) – 4:48
"Granada" (Agustín Lara) – 4:03
"Santa Lucia" (Teodoro Cottrau) – 4:01
"That's Amore" (Harry Warren/Jack Brooks) – 3:10
"Ave Maria" (Franz Schubert) – 4:34
"Questa o Quella" (Giuseppe Verdi) – 2:01
"Nothing Sacred" (Jim Steinman/Don Black) – 4:07
"The Pearl Fishers' Duet" (Georges Bizet/Eugène Cormon/Michel Carré) – 5:03
"Pourquoi Me réveiller?" (Jules Massenet/Édouard Blau/Paul Milliet/Georges Hartmann) – 2:35
"Recondita armonia" (Giacomo Puccini/Luigi Illica/Giuseppe Giacosa) – 2:52
"La Danza" (Gioachino Rossini/Carlo Pepoli) – 3:19
"Core 'ngrato" (Salvatore Cardillo/Riccardo Cordiferro) – 6:45
"The Living Years" (Mike Rutherford/B. A. Robertson) – 5:49
"I Don't Know How I Got By" (Diane Warren) – 3:39
"The Best That Love Can Be" (Chris De Burgh) – 4:03
"Bohemian Rhapsody" (Freddie Mercury) – 6:38
"Vesti la Giubba" (Ruggero Leoncavallo) – 2:48

Charts

References

Russell Watson albums
2002 albums
Classical crossover albums
Albums produced by Nick Patrick (record producer)